Ferzikovo is an urban locality (a settlement) and the administrative center of Ferzikovsky District of Kaluga Oblast, Russia, located  east of Kaluga and approximately  south of the Kaluga–Tarusa route. Population:  Postal code: 249800. Dialing code: +7 48437.

History
It was founded in 1874.

Government
The chief of the Administration is Alexander Albertovich Seryakov.

Economy
Electric heaters manufacturing plant
Sawn timber production
Agricultural association

Transportation
The settlement serves as a railway station of the Kaluga–Tula railway.

References

External links 
 Ферзиковский район 
 Ферзиково, усадьба

Rural localities in Kaluga Oblast
Kaluga Governorate